Jacopo Massari (born 2 June 1988) is an Italian volleyball player, a member of the Italy men's national volleyball team and Italian club Cucine Lube Civitanova, silver medalist of the 2015 World Cup, bronze medalist of the 2015 European Championship. He wears Solhanspor jersey in Turkish Men's Volleyball League.

Sporting achievements

Clubs
 FIVB Club World Championship
  Poland 2019 – with Cucine Lube Civitanova
  Brazil 2019 – with Cucine Lube Civitanova

References

External links
 FIVB profile 
 LegaVolley player profile

1988 births
Living people
Italian men's volleyball players
Volleyball players at the 2015 European Games
European Games competitors for Italy
Outside hitters